This is a List of San Diego Historic Landmarks. In 1967, the City of San Diego established a Historical Resources Board with the authority to designate and protect landmarks from inappropriate alterations. In total, the city has designated more than 1,000 structures or other properties as Historic Landmarks. Many of the properties have also received recognition at the federal level by inclusion on the National Register of Historic Places or by designation as National Historic Landmarks.

Listing of San Diego Historic Landmarks

See also

 National Register of Historic Places listings in San Diego County
 List of San Diego Historical Landmarks in La Jolla, California
 List of San Diego Historic Landmarks in the Point Loma and Ocean Beach areas

References

External links
 Sandiego.gov: official List of Historical Landmarks Designated by the San Diego Historical Resources Board

 01
Lists of places in California
Historic Landmarks
Heritage registers in California
History of San Diego County, California
Locally designated landmarks in the United States